Queen's Hospital is a hospital in Romford, London. Queen's Hospital or Queens Hospital can also refer to:

 The Queen's Hospital, a former hospital in Birmingham, England now the site of Birmingham Accident Hospital
 Queen's Hospital, now Queen Mary's Hospital, Sidcup in Sidcup, south east London
 Queen Elizabeth Hospital for Children, originally Queen's Hospital for Children, a former hospital in Tower Hamlets, London
 Queens Hospital Center in Queens, New York

See also 
 Queen's Medical Centre in Nottingham, England
 The Queen's Medical Center in Honolulu, Hawaii
 List of hospitals in Queens, New York
 Queen Elizabeth Hospital (disambiguation)
 Queen Mary's Hospital (disambiguation)